The Abbey of St. Andoche (also Abbaye royale Sainte-Marie et Saint-Andoche d'Autun) in Autun, Saône-et-Loire, France, is a former Benedictine nunnery founded in 592 by Queen Brunhilda on the site of a Roman temple of Diana. The buildings largely survived the French Revolution.

References

Benedictine nunneries in France
Buildings and structures in Saône-et-Loire